Pnina Rosenblum (born ) is an Israeli businesswoman, model, media personality, and a former politician. Former Knesset parliament member for Likud from 2005 to 2006.

Biography
Pnina Rosenblum was born in Petah Tikva, Israel, to immigrant parents; an Ashkenazi Jewish father from Germany and a Mizrahi Jewish mother from Iraq. She served for seven months in military bands of the Israel Defense Forces. In the early 1990s she married Moshe Haim, with whom she adopted a daughter and a son from orphanages in Russia and in Romania, respectively. Haim and Rosenblum got divorced, re-married, and then got divorced again.

In 2004, she married  Israeli businessman Ronny Simanovich, father of three from his previous marriage, one of whom is Israeli model Coral Simanovich (Spanish footballer Sergi Roberto's wife).

Modeling, acting and singing career 

Rosenblum was an actress and fashion model, known to foreign media in her youth as Pnina Golan. She appeared in the Israeli films Kasach (1984), Am Yisrael Hai (1981), Lo LeShidur (1981), Diamante Lobo (1976), and Malkat HaKvish (1971).

She debuted as a singer in 1983, in a bid to represent Israel in the Eurovision Song Contest. Her entry, Tamid Isha ("Always a Woman") was ranked last, yet gained popularity in Israel.

In 2014, she and her daughter Chen competed as a team on the fourth season of the Israeli version of The Amazing Race, HaMerotz LaMillion. Pnina tripped and fractured her wrist immediately after departing the Starting Line, eliminating them from the competition before they even had a chance to leave Israel.

Political career

In 1999, she formed an independent list named after herself, together with Avi Balashnikov, in order to run in the  1999 Knesset (the Israeli parliament) elections. Her party did not pass the electoral threshold of 1.5%, although her party became the largest without representation. The party dissolved soon afterwards.

Rosenblum later joined the Likud party, and on 10 December 2005 entered the Knesset, the Israeli parliament, after the defection of several Likud MKs to Kadima opened up spaces for new Likud members. However, she lost her seat four months later in the March 2006 elections. In 2009 the Likud placed her at the unrealistic 46th place.

Business career
In 1989, she founded her own cosmetics company, Pnina Rosenblum Ltd.

References

External links

Pnina Rosenblom's website

Cosmetics queen 2008 CNN interview by Atika Shubert

1954 births
Living people
Independent politicians in Israel
Israeli actor-politicians
Israeli cosmetics businesspeople
Israeli female models
Israeli film actresses
Israeli people of German-Jewish descent
Israeli people of Iraqi-Jewish descent
21st-century Israeli businesswomen
21st-century Israeli businesspeople
Jewish female models
Jewish Israeli actresses
Jewish Israeli politicians
Leaders of political parties in Israel
Likud politicians
Members of the 16th Knesset (2003–2006)
People from Petah Tikva
Women members of the Knesset
21st-century Israeli women politicians
Israeli Ashkenazi Jews
Israeli Sephardi Jews
Israeli Mizrahi Jews
The Amazing Race contestants
20th-century Israeli businesswomen
20th-century Israeli businesspeople